Patricia Ann "Pat" Timmons-Goodson (born September 18, 1954) is an American judge and politician who served on the North Carolina Supreme Court from 2006 to 2012. She previously served on the United States Commission on Civil Rights and is a former nominee to be a federal judge for the United States District Court for the Eastern District of North Carolina. Timmons-Goodson ran for Congress in 2020.

Early life and education
Timmons-Goodson was born in Florence, South Carolina, the daughter of a U.S. Army enlisted man (Sergeant First Class) and homemaker, and was raised on military bases in the United States and Europe. She attended the University of North Carolina at Chapel Hill, receiving a Bachelor of Arts degree in speech in 1976. She received a Juris Doctor in 1979 from University of North Carolina School of Law. In 2014, she received a Master of Laws degree in Judicial Studies from the Duke University School of Law.

Career 
She began her career working as a district manager for the United States Census Bureau’s Charlotte Regional Office, from 1979 to 1980. From 1981 to 1983, she served as an assistant district attorney for the Office of the District Attorney for the 12th judicial district in Fayetteville, North Carolina. From 1983 to 1984, she was a staff attorney for Lumbee River Legal Services.

She was named a Cumberland County District Court Judge in 1984; she was subsequently elected as a Democrat to four-year terms as a district judge in 1986, 1990, and 1994. In 1997, she was appointed by Governor Jim Hunt to the North Carolina Court of Appeals. She retired from that court in late 2005. On January 19, 2006, North Carolina Governor Mike Easley appointed her to the North Carolina Supreme Court to take the place of Associate Justice Sarah Parker.  Upon taking her seat in February 2006, she was the first African American woman to serve on the Court.  She was elected by the voters to remain on the Court in November 2006, defeating Judge Eric Levinson. She made it known in November 2012 that she would resign her seat before the end of the year. Court of Appeals Judge Cheri Beasley was appointed to fill her seat.

Timmons-Goodson was inducted into the North Carolina Women's Hall of Fame in 2010. In 2014, President Barack Obama appointed her to the United States Commission on Civil Rights. She has served as the Vice Chair of that Commission since 2015.

Expired nomination to district court
On April 28, 2016, President Obama nominated Timmons-Goodson to serve as a United States District Judge of the United States District Court for the Eastern District of North Carolina, to the seat vacated by Judge Malcolm Jones Howard, who took senior status on December 31, 2005. Her nomination expired on January 3, 2017, with the end of the 114th Congress.

2020 campaign for Congress
In 2019, Timmons-Goodson filed to run for the United States House of Representatives seat representing North Carolina's 8th congressional district. The 8th district covers all or part of 7 counties including Cabarrus, Stanly, Montgomery, Moore, Lee, Harnett, and Cumberland. Timmons-Goodson lost to incumbent Republican Richard Hudson in the general election in November 2020, by 53% to 47%.

Personal life 
Timmons-Goodson is a member of The Links.

See also
 Barack Obama judicial appointment controversies
 List of African-American jurists

References

External links

 Pat Timmons-Goodson for Congress campaign website
 

 News & Observer biography
 

1954 births
African-American judges
Duke University School of Law alumni
Living people
North Carolina Court of Appeals judges
North Carolina Democrats
Justices of the North Carolina Supreme Court
People from Florence, South Carolina
United States Commission on Civil Rights members
University of North Carolina School of Law alumni
20th-century American judges
20th-century American women judges
21st-century American judges
21st-century American women judges
20th-century African-American women
20th-century African-American people
21st-century African-American women
21st-century African-American people